Vakhsh (Russian and Tajik: Вахш) is a village in Khatlon Region, Southwestern Tajikistan. It is part of the jamoat Istiqlol (formerly: Telman) in Jayhun District. It lies 7 km northwest of the district seat Dusti, and approximately 130 kilometers south of the capital, Dushanbe.

References

Populated places in Khatlon Region